"It Ain't Over 'til It's Over" is a song written, produced, and performed by American musician Lenny Kravitz for his second studio album, Mama Said (1991). Released as the album's second single in June 1991, the song is a mid-tempo ballad musically inspired by Motown, Philly soul, and Earth, Wind & Fire (particularly "That's the Way of the World"). The horn line at the end is performed by the Phenix Horns from Earth, Wind & Fire. "That song just came out one day, and I knew it had a classic vibe. And I still love that song very much today," Kravitz said in an interview for VivaMusic.com in 2000. The line is based on a Yogiism, or quotation from Yogi Berra: "It ain't over 'til it's over."

"It Ain't Over 'til It's Over" was Kravitz's first top-10 hit on the US Billboard Hot 100, reaching  2 to become his highest peak on the chart. Worldwide, the single also reached No. 2 in Canada and peaked within the top 10 on the charts of Australia, the Netherlands, and New Zealand. In the United Kingdom, it reached No. 11 on the UK Singles Chart. British singer Mutya Buena's 2007 song "Real Girl" contains a sample from "It Ain't Over 'til It's Over"; this recording peaked at No. 2 on the UK chart.

Background
The song was written by Kravitz while dealing with a struggling marriage to his then wife, Lisa Bonet, and was an attempt to rekindle the relationship. Kravitz has described his thinking at that time as "not just a depression, but a fog. I didn’t know which way was up".

Initially Kravitz, realizing the hit potential of the song, did not want to release the song himself, wishing to remain an underground artist, thinking instead of giving the song to Smokey Robinson. His label however eventually persuaded him to include it on the album.

Chart performance
"It Ain't Over 'til It's Over" is Kravitz's most successful single on the U.S. Billboard Hot 100 chart to date, peaking at No. 2. It also reached No. 2 on the Canadian RPM Top Singles chart. It was also popular in the United Kingdom, where it peaked at No. 11 on the UK Singles Chart.

Critical reception
Stephen Thomas Erlewine from AllMusic noted the song's "swirling Philly soul", describing it as "instantly addictive". Larry Flick from Billboard complimented it as a "delicious slice of Philly soul/pop, flavored with lush strings, understated funk bass and guitar riffs, and Kravitz's engaging falsetto vocal. Could be a sleeper smash." Alex Henderson from Cashbox named the song one of the "goodies" from the album, describing it as "uptown soul"-flavoured. Adam Sweeting from The Guardian declared it as "nimble soul with chart potential". Pan-European magazine Music & Media felt the singer "sings in smooth tones, reminiscent of Curtis Mayfield and the Style Council. Soultime on EHR." Parry Gettelman from Orlando Sentinel complimented "a nice guitar solo that sounds a bit like Hall & Oates circa "She's Gone"." Sunday Tribunes reviewer also noted the echoes of Paul Weller and Mayfield in the song. 

Retrospective response
In an 2016 retrospective review, Christopher A. Daniel from Albumism remarked that the song "marries his Curtis Mayfield-inspired falsetto with chunky Stax Records guitars and a lush MFSB-flavored (possibly Love Unlimited Orchestra) string arrangement." In 2020, Carla Hay of AXS ranked it number four in her list of "The Top 10 Best Lenny Kravitz Songs". She wrote, "Kravitz has said he wrote this song about the breakdown of his marriage to actress Lisa Bonet (they eventually divorced), and the heartbreak is oozing all over this song." She added, "With a Motown-ish 1960s vibe, this ballad (from 1991’s Mama Said album) is one of Kravitz’s best ballads. It remains his highest-charting hit of his career in the U.S., where it peaked at No. 2 on the Billboard Hot 100 chart."

Music video
The accompanying music video for "It Ain't Over 'til It's Over", directed by Jesse Dylan, features Kravitz and his band performing the song. Different kinds of background lighting colors were featured in the video.

Track listings and formats

 US cassette singleA. "It Ain't Over 'til It's Over"
B. "I'll Be Around"

 7-inch single and UK cassette single "It Ain't Over 'til It's Over" – 3:55
 "The Difference Is Why" – 4:48

 12-inch and CD single "It Ain't Over 'til It's Over" – 3:55
 "I'll Be Around"
 "The Difference Is Why" – 4:48

 UK 12-inch picture discA. "It Ain't Over 'til It's Over" – 3:55
B. Lenny Kravitz talking to Robert Sandall in an interview for Q magazine – 15:20

 Japanese CD single'
 "It Ain't Over 'til It's Over" – 4:01
 "Let Love Rule" – 5:43
 "I'll Be Around" – 2:55
 "Always on the Run" (instrumental) – 3:56

Personnel
 Lenny Kravitz – vocals, guitar, bass guitar, electric piano, drums, electric sitar
 The Phenix Horns – horn section

Charts

Weekly charts

Year-end charts

Release history

References

External links

1990s ballads
1991 singles
Lenny Kravitz songs
Soul ballads
Song recordings produced by Lenny Kravitz
Songs written by Lenny Kravitz
1991 songs
Virgin Records singles